Air Commodore Ellen Chiweshe is an officer of the Air Force of Zimbabwe.

She was promoted to the rank of air commodore by President Robert Mugabe on 3 January 2016; the first woman to be promoted to that rank.  She had previously held the rank of group captain.  After her promotion she became the third highest-ranking officer in the air force.

Her promotion ceremony was presided over by Air Marshal Perrance Shiri, commander of the air force.  Shiri stated "the sky is the limit. There is nothing that can stop women from attaining high posts" and that "Air Commodore Chiweshe was promoted not because of bias or favour but because of her competency".

References 

Zimbabwean military leaders
Female air force generals and air marshals
Living people

Year of birth missing (living people)